Macalayo is an island located between the towns of Taft and Sulat in Eastern Samar, Philippines.

Islands of Eastern Samar